Vincent Frank Vella (January 11, 1947 – February 20, 2019) was an American actor, talk show host and comedian. He acted in more than forty films often in the role of a gangster.  He was best known for the role of Artie Piscano in Martin Scorsese's Casino and Jimmy Petrille in the HBO show The Sopranos.

Early life
Vella was born on Bleecker Street in Greenwich Village, New York City. His father was from Bari, Italy and his mother was from Naples, Italy. Vella's father had a fish store in Little Italy.

Career
Vella acted in more than forty films often in the role of gangster. He was best known for the role of Artie Piscano in Martin Scorsese's Casino. He played Jimmy Petrille on the HBO show The Sopranos. He was the subject of a 67-minute 2000 documentary called Hey, Vinny by director John Huba. In New York City, he hosted a public-access television cable TV show on MNN, the Vinny Vella show. He appeared in more than 35 advertisements.

Personal life
He was married to Margaret Ann Hernandez; they had one son, Vincent Vella Jr. Besides Vincent Vella Jr., Vinny was also a father to Ben and Anthony Hernandez, Jennifer Maloney and Lauren Vella. Vella was at one time the "Mayor of Elizabeth Street". In 2007, he opened his own pizzeria in Williamsburg, a neighborhood in the New York City borough of Brooklyn.

In June 2008, Vella was involved in controversy around a lottery ticket, according to some sources, and threatened to sue over it.

Death
Vella died at home on Elizabeth Street, New York City  on February 20, 2019, due to liver cancer, at age 72.

Filmography

Film
Vella's films include:

Television

References

External links
 
 

1947 births
2019 deaths
American male film actors
People of Apulian descent
American people of Italian descent
Male actors from New York City
Deaths from cancer in New York (state)
Deaths from liver cancer